Blanco (Spanish: "white") is a city in rural Blanco County, Texas, United States. The population was 1,739 at the 2010 census. Blanco is a cattle and ranching community.

Geography
Blanco is located in the Texas Hill Country on the Blanco River.

Climate
<div style="width:65%">

</div style>

Demographics

2020 census

As of the 2020 United States census, there were 1,682 people, 978 households, and 530 families residing in the city.

2000 census
As of the census of 2000, there were 1,701 people, 576 households, and 370 families residing in the city. The population density was 899.7 people per square mile (348.0/km2). There were 633 housing units at an average density of 378.4 per square mile (146.3/km2). The racial makeup of the city was 88.77% White, 1.20% African American, 1.33% Native American, 0.40% Asian, 7.31% from other races, and 1.00% from two or more races. Hispanic or Latino of any race were 22.72% of the population. The 2014 Census Estimate showed a population of 1,876.

There were 576 households, out of which 32.3% had children under the age of 18 living with them, 47.6% were married couples living together, 13.2% had a female householder with no husband present, and 35.6% were non-families. 31.9% of all households were made up of individuals, and 16.5% had someone living alone who was 65 years of age or older. The average household size was 2.46 and the average family size was 3.13.

In the city, the population was spread out, with 25.8% under the age of 18, 8.3% from 18 to 24, 23.5% from 25 to 44, 21.3% from 45 to 64, and 21.1% who were 65 years of age or older. The median age was 39 years. For every 100 females, there were 88.4 males. For every 100 females age 18 and over, there were 79.7 males.

The median income for a household in the city was $31,071, and the median income for a family was $40,398. Males had a median income of $27,188 versus $21,845 for females. The per capita income for the city was $14,797. About 9.9% of families and 13.1% of the population were below the poverty line, including 13.6% of those under age 18 and 10.0% of those age 65 or over.

Education
Blanco is served by the Blanco Independent School District and home to the Blanco High School Panthers.

Notable people 
 Terence T. Henricks, astronaut
 Patrick Higginbotham, judge
 Emery Nix, professional football player
 Willie Upshaw, professional baseball player
 William D. Wittliff, screenwriter, author and photographer

Gallery

References

External links 
 
 Blanco Chamber of Commerce
 

Cities in Blanco County, Texas
Cities in Texas